"I'll Be" is a song written and performed by American singer Edwin McCain. The song was serviced to US radio in October 1997 and was commercially released on September 8, 1998, as the first single from his second album, Misguided Roses (1997). McCain recorded an acoustic version of the song for his follow-up album, Messenger. The radio version of "I'll Be", which was released on a CD single with "Grind Me in the Gears" as the B-side, differs from the album version. Its opening melody is played with electric guitar (as opposed to acoustic on the album) and the vocal and saxophone lines differ. Upon its release, the song reached number five in the United States and number 52 in Canada.

On December 22, 1999, McCain recorded a version with Warren Haynes on the live concert album from the 11th Annual Christmas Jam, a benefit concert for Habitat for Humanity in Asheville, North Carolina. The album is titled Wintertime Blues: The Benefit Concert. In 2015, McCain re-recorded "I'll Be" for his EP Phoenix.

Content
Although "I'll Be" has become a popular wedding song, McCain said "it's really more of a prayer" written in a moment of personal desperation after a break-up, the idea being that "maybe if I write my future, it'll come true."

McCain said, "It was the end of a relationship for me, and it was also an admission of my inability to function in a relationship, hence the love suicide line. And it was the hope that I would be better, grow and be better as a person. I was struggling with some personal problems at the time, as well, so it was all of those things. It was this admission of failure and this prayer that I could be a better person, wrapped up as sort of the end of a relationship kind of thought. And it was something that I said to a girl that I'd been going out with. I knew that she was waiting, and I always said to her, 'Don't ever look back on this in any other way than I'll be your biggest fan.' You know, 'I'll always be a fan.'"

Chart performance
In the United States, "I'll Be" debuted on the Billboard Hot 100 Airplay chart on the issue dated February 28, 1998, and went on to peak at number four there in November, in its 39th week on the chart. Under the chart rules at the time, which required songs to have a physical single release, "I'll Be" was initially ineligible for the Billboard Hot 100, but on September 8, 1998, a "very limited pressing" of the song was issued, making it then eligible; it debuted at number seven on the Hot 100 on the issue dated September 26, 1998, and ultimately peaked at number five the following week. While it was only McCain's second single to chart, it became his first and only top-10 hit and his biggest hit.

Track listings
7-inch vinyl and CD single
 "I'll Be" – 4:25
 "Grind Me in the Gears" – 4:19

Digital download
 "I'll Be" (LP version) – 4:26
 "I'll Be" (acoustic version) – 4:37
 "I'll Be" (video) – 4:07

Charts

Weekly charts

Year-end charts

Release history

Kian Egan version

In 2014, "I'll Be" was covered by Irish musician Kian Egan. The song was included on his debut album, and was released as a single on May 12, 2014, through Rhino Records.

Background and production
In an interview with Digital Spy, Egan said "I chose 'I'll Be' for my second single, as I've always absolutely loved this song. This song means a lot to me and being able to record it was an honour. I'm incredibly excited to be able to perform this for all my fans."

Music video
The footage was shot in Egan's hometown of Sligo, in County Sligo, and the singer can be seen strumming a guitar while wandering along the deserted beach. 
In the visual, Egan also throws pebbles out to sea before meeting up with friends around a campfire.

Artwork
The single cover of the song shows Egan sitting on a plush red sofa and holding a white guitar.

Track listings
 Promotional CD single
 "I'll Be" (radio mix) – 3:09

 Promotional CD single
 "I'll Be" (radio mix)
 "I Run to You" (featuring Jodi Albert)

In popular culture
At the height of the song's popularity back in 1998, it was featured during a pivotal moment in the first-season finale episode titled "Decisions" on the WB series Dawson's Creek. In the episode of The Office "Here Comes Treble", the song is covered by Andy Bernard's a cappella group.

In the 2022 movie, Shotgun Wedding, the song is sung by the cast during the climax of the film.

References

 

1997 songs
1998 singles
2014 singles
Edwin McCain songs
Lava Records singles
Rhino Records singles
Song recordings produced by Brian Rawling
Song recordings produced by Matt Serletic